Two human polls and a committee's selections comprised the 2018 National Collegiate Athletic Association (NCAA) Division I Football Bowl Subdivision (FBS) football rankings, in addition to various publications' preseason polls. Unlike most sports, college football's governing body, the NCAA, does not bestow a national championship, instead that title is bestowed by one or more different polling agencies. There are two main weekly polls that begin in the preseason—the AP Poll and the Coaches Poll. One additional poll, the College Football Playoff (CFP) ranking, is released midway through the season after the ninth week. The CFP rankings determine who makes the four-team playoff which determines the College Football Playoff National Champion.

Legend

AP Poll

Coaches Poll

CFP rankings

References

Rankings
NCAA Division I FBS football rankings
Rankings